Kruk may refer to:

People
Kruk (surname)
Kruk, a nickname of Mike Krukow's

Other uses
Kruk, a fictional legal concept of dwarfs in Discworld
PZL-106 Kruk, a Polish aircraft

See also